George Arthur Bridgett (11 October 1882 – 26 July 1954) was an English footballer who played most of his career, playing at outside left, for Sunderland and also made eleven appearances for England. He scored 116 goals in 347 league and cup games in ten seasons at Roker Park, after joining from Stoke in 1902. He later managed both South Shields and North Shields, before making an unlikely return to the Football League with Port Vale in 1923 after nine years without competitive football (he had though guested for the club once during World War I).

Early and personal life
George Arthur Bridgett was born on 11 October 1882 in Forsbrook, Staffordshire. He was the third of five children to Edwin and Hannah (née Bailey); his father worked as a stone mason and his mother was a furniture dealer. He married Gertrude May Forrester in Stoke-on-Trent in March 1918. After retiring from football, he worked in Ashley, Newcastle-under-Lyme as a fish salesman and a car/lorry contract driver.

Club career

Sunderland
Bridgett played local football with Burslem Park and Trentham, before joining Stoke in October 1902. After only seven games for Stoke in the 1902–03 season, he moved to First Division rivals Sunderland in December 1902. He went on to captain the "Black Cats" for ten years and gain his eleven caps, making him Sunderland's second most-capped England International behind Dave Watson.

He made his Sunderland debut in a 0–0 draw with Sheffield United, but was quickly on the score-sheet scoring at Grimsby Town in the next match. Bridgett was a winger with an excellent goal scoring pedigree. His superb finishing meant that he could also operate as a striker, and he was twice on the score sheet against Newcastle United in a 9–1 victory at St James' Park on 5 December 1908. He was also a good crosser of the ball, making numerous chances for his fellow strikers, including fellow England international George Holley.

In his first three seasons at Roker Park, Sunderland finished third, sixth and fifth in the First Division table. Bridgett was Sunderland's top scorer in 1905–06 with 17 goals as they finished in 14th place. The following season, Bridgett was again Sunderland's top scorer with 25 league goals, but Sunderland were only able to improve their league position to tenth.

In 1907–08, Bridgett scored 15 goals with Holley top scorer on 24 as Sunderland again finished in the lower half of the table. For the next few seasons, Holley took over the goal-scoring duties with Sunderland taking third-place finishes in 1908–09 and 1910–11.

He wound up his Sunderland career at the end of the 1911–12 season to become player-manager at South Shields. In all competitions, he made 347 appearances for Sunderland, scoring 116 goals, ranking him eighth in Sunderland's all-time top scorer's list. The 1913–14 season saw him score 30 goals in 47 matches for South Shields.

Management spell
On 10 July 1912, he joined South Shields as player-manager for a transfer fee of £175. He later managed North Shields.

Port Vale
During the war he guested for Port Vale, scoring twice in a 5–2 home win over Manchester United in a war league match on 28 April 1917.

After an eleven-year gap away from the Football League, he returned as a player for Port Vale for the 1923–24 season at the age of 41. Ninety seconds into his first Vale game for over six years he had scored; this was the only goal in a win over Clapton Orient at The Old Recreation Ground on 10 November 1923. However, he lost his first team place in February 1924, and departed three months later for Sandbach Ramblers. He had scored seven goals from 14 Second Division appearances.

International career
Bridgett's England call-up came on 1 April 1905 against Scotland, when England won 1–0 with a goal from Joe Bache. His second cap came three years later on 4 April 1908, again against Scotland at Hampden Park. This match was played in front of a new world record crowd of 121,452 and ended in a 1–1 draw.

Bridgett was then part of the squad chosen for England's first overseas tour in 1908, playing in all four matches against Austria, Hungary and Bohemia; he scored in both of the matches against Austria which England won 6–1 and 11–1.

The following year, he played in the British Home Championship matches against Ireland (4–0) and Wales (2–0); England won the tournament. He was again selected for the summer tour of Europe, playing in all three matches, scoring in the 4–2 victory over Hungary. The last match of the tour, against Austria on 1 June 1909, brought his international career to a close.

Style of play
Bridgett was a deeply religious man, and refused to play on Good Friday or Christmas Day throughout his career. He was renowned for his accurate crossing ability.

Career statistics

Club statistics
Source:

International statistics

Honours
England
 British Home Championship: 1904–05, 1907–08 (shared), 1908–09

References

External links
 
 
 

1882 births
1954 deaths
People from Forsbrook
Association football wingers
English footballers
England international footballers
Stoke City F.C. players
Sunderland A.F.C. players
Port Vale F.C. players
Sandbach Ramblers F.C. players
English Football League players
English Football League representative players
Port Vale F.C. wartime guest players
Association football player-managers
English football managers
Gateshead A.F.C. managers
North Shields F.C. managers